Walter Kittredge (October 6, 1834 – July 8, 1905), was a famous musician during the American Civil War.

Born in Merrimack, New Hampshire, the tenth of eleven children, Kittredge was a talented self-taught musician who played the seraphine, the melodeon (types of reed-like organs), and the violin. Kittredge toured solo and with the Hutchinson Family, a musical troupe. Over his career he wrote over 500 songs, many of them dealing with themes of the American Civil War.

His most famous song, Tenting on the Old Camp Ground, also known as "Tenting Tonight", was sung by both sides of the war and is known throughout the world. Kittredge had offered the song to a Boston publisher for $15 and been rejected; but when it was published several months later, ten thousand copies were sold within the first three months. Kittredge had been drafted into the American Civil War in 1863, but prior to his physical, had experienced a severe attack of rheumatic fever, and been rejected by the draft board. Unable to sleep that night, he was inspired to compose his most famous song. Kittredge stated that "I actually saw the whole scene, as described in the song."

Kittredge was also a noted supporter of abolitionism and the Temperance movement.

He married Annie E. Fairfield in 1861, and in 1905, he died in his birthplace, a house on Bedford Road, Merrimack, NH.

Other songs written by him include:
 No Night
 Golden Streets
 Scatter the Flowers Over the Blue and Gray
 Sing the Old War Songs Again

References

External links
 

1834 births
1905 deaths
People of the American Civil War
People of New Hampshire in the American Civil War
People from Merrimack, New Hampshire